Brachychiton carruthersii is a species of flowering plant in the family Malvaceae. It is found only in Papua New Guinea. It is threatened by habitat loss.

Notes

References

carruthersii
Endemic flora of Papua New Guinea
Vulnerable plants
Taxonomy articles created by Polbot